Sakri Photovoltaic solar energy project is a 125 MW solar photovoltaic power plant. The project was developed by Mahagenco in Shivajinagar in Sakri taluka of Dhule district in Maharashtra, India. Its cost was about Rs 20 billion, and it became operational in 2013. Completion was in March 2013.

KfW, a German financial institution, has agreed to finance the project. Work has already started on 125 MW (5x25MW) Solar Photovoltaic part while for remaining 100 MW part, based on crystalline technology, international bids have been invited.

References 

Photovoltaic power stations in India
Solar power stations in Maharashtra
Dhule district
Energy infrastructure completed in 2013
2012 establishments in Maharashtra